Transcription initiation factor TFIID subunit 10 is a protein that in humans is encoded by the TAF10 gene.

Function 

Initiation of transcription by RNA polymerase II requires the activities of more than 70 polypeptides. The protein that coordinates these activities is transcription factor IID (TFIID), which binds to the core promoter to position the polymerase properly, serves as the scaffold for assembly of the remainder of the transcription complex, and acts as a channel for regulatory signals. TFIID is composed of the TATA-binding protein (TBP) and a group of evolutionarily conserved proteins known as TBP-associated factors or TAFs. TAFs may participate in basal transcription, serve as coactivators, function in promoter recognition or modify general transcription factors (GTFs) to facilitate complex assembly and transcription initiation. This gene encodes one of the small subunits of TFIID that is associated with a subset of TFIID complexes. Studies with human and mammalian cells have shown that this subunit is required for transcriptional activation by the estrogen receptor, for progression through the cell cycle, and may also be required for certain cellular differentiation programs.

Interactions 

TAF10 has been shown to interact with TAF9, Transcription initiation protein SPT3 homolog, TAF13 and TATA binding protein.

References

Further reading

External links